Nikil Saval (born December 27, 1982) is an Indian-American magazine editor, writer, organizer, activist, and politician. A member of the Democratic Party, he represents the 1st district in the Pennsylvania State Senate.

Early life and education
Saval was born in Los Angeles, California to parents from Bangalore growing up in West Los Angeles. He graduated from Columbia College of Columbia University with a B.A. in 2005 and received a Ph.D. in English from Stanford University in 2014.

Writing career
Saval was a co-editor of n+1, as well as a contributor to The New York Times, and The New Yorker, covering architecture and design. He currently serves on the board of directors of n+1.

Saval's book, Cubed: A Secret History of the Workplace (2014), examines the long-term evolution of the office, from its roots in nineteenth century counting houses to the cubicle, and considers how such workplaces, and the lives of its workers, could be improved in the future. The book was a New York Times notable book of 2014.

Political career

Activism 
Saval was a co-founder of Reclaim Philadelphia, an organization that formed out of the Bernie Sanders 2016 presidential campaign. His group helped elect Larry Krasner to district attorney of Philadelphia. In 2018, Saval became the Ward Leader of Philadelphia's 2nd Ward.

Pennsylvania State Senate 
In 2020, he challenged Democratic incumbent Larry Farnese for his seat in the Pennsylvania State Senate, earning the endorsement of Senator Bernie Sanders in May 2020. Saval based his campaign around a Green New Deal, prison reform, guaranteed affordable housing, redevelopment of Philadelphia schools, and Medicare for All. He beat Farnese in the primary and became de facto State Senator-elect, as he had no opposition in the general election.

He was a member of the Democratic Socialists of America from 2014 through at least 2020.

In 2022,  Saval introduced the Whole-Home Repairs Act, legislation which aims to provide eligible residents with grants of up to $50,000 to make health-and-safety focused home repairs. Small landlords would also be eligible to apply for similar loans under the same program, and the state government would also invest in training qualified home-repair workers. This program is partly intended to help low-income residents become eligible for federal grants from the Weatherization Assistance Program (WAP), which subsidizes energy-efficiency upgrades for poorer residents. Despite Saval himself’s position on the left wing of the Democratic party, Saval’s bill has received signals of support from several Republican committee chairs.

Personal life
Saval is married to Shannon Garrison. The couple live in Philadelphia with their son.

Books
 Cubed: A Secret History of the Workplace (2014),

References

External links
 Profile at the Pennsylvania State Senate
 Campaign website
 Reclaim Philadelphia

1982 births
Living people
American editors
American male journalists
American politicians of Indian descent
Asian-American people in Pennsylvania politics
Democratic Socialists of America politicians from Pennsylvania
Democratic Party Pennsylvania state senators
Pennsylvania socialists
Columbia College (New York) alumni
Stanford University alumni
21st-century American politicians
Politicians from Philadelphia